The 1993–94 UCLA Bruins men's basketball team represented the University of California, Los Angeles in the 1993–94 NCAA Division I men's basketball season. Jim Harrick for the sixth year led the Bruins as head coach. UCLA started the season ranked #14 in the AP poll. The Bruins started their season with an excellent 14–0 record. After finishing 2nd in the Pac-10 The Bruins accepted a bid to the NCAA tournament. They were seeded 5th in the Midwest Region, but lost to 12th Seed Tulsa in the first round in a high scoring game, 102–112.

Starting lineup

Roster

Schedule

|-
!colspan=9 style=|Regular Season

|-
!colspan=9 style=| NCAA tournament

Source

Rankings

References

UCLA Bruins men's basketball seasons
Ucla
Ucla
NCAA
NCAA